Die Deutsche Kinemathek – Museum für Film und Fernsehen is a major German film archive located in Berlin.

History
The Deutsche Kinemathek opened in 1963. Until the opening of a permanent display in the Museum of Film and Television Berlin (Museum für Film und Fernsehen) on 1 June 2006, it was known simply by this name; as the Deutsche Kinemathek, after that date acquiring the second part of its name.

Since 1977, the Deutsche Kinemathek has supervised the annual "Retrospective and Homage" section of the Berlin International Film Festival (Berlinale).

Since late 2000, part of the archived collection has been exhibited at the "Filmhaus' on Potsdamer Platz.

Description
The collection contains a wide range of material relating to film and television, including the estate of Marlene Dietrich; items donated by famous German director Werner Herzog and TV documentary filmmaker Georg Stefan Troller; important film scripts, ranging from Carl Mayer to Christian Petzold.

The film archive contains copies of over 26,500 films, as well as an inventory of over 40,000 films on video, DVD and Blu-ray. Mediathek Fernsehen contains over 9,000 broadcasts, made over around 70 years in both East and West Germany as well as modern Germany. In addition, the archival collection includes photographs, posters, costumes and architectural sketches.

The permanent exhibition in the Filmhaus includes the set designs for Fritz Lang's futuristic 1927 film Metropolis, Marlene Dietrich's cosmetics case, and the clothing from Wolfgang Petersen's 1981 war film Das Boot.

 the Berlinale continues to use Zeughauskino a venue for some of its Retrospectives screenings.

Museum of Film and Television Berlin

The Museum of Film and Television Berlin (German: Museum für Film und Fernsehen) is one of seven film museums in Germany, and is located at Potsdamer Straße 2 in Berlin. It opened in 2000 as part of the Deutsche Kinemathek.

The Museum of Film and Television Berlin's permanent exhibition displays exhibits from the entire span of German film and television history, including the exile of many artists to Hollywood during the Nazi era. The exhibits include posters, photos, film costumes, architectural sketches, and props. A particular focus is the actress Marlene Dietrich compiled from an extensive private collection.

In addition to the permanent exhibition, the museum hosts film and television exhibitions, such as during the Berlinale.  The museum also features a library with extensive collections of literature and film journals, including important early magazines like The Cinematograph, the photo-stage and the Film-Kurier. Until it moved to the film museum, the library belonged to the German Film and Television Academy (dffb).

The museum is a member of the German Kinemathekenverbund.

See also 
 List of film archives
 Museum of Film and Television Berlin

References

External links 
  (in German)

Film archives in Germany
Cinema museums in Germany
Museums in Berlin
1963 establishments in Germany
FIAF-affiliated institutions